"Miss You" is the 15th single by m-flo and was released on October 22, 2003.

Introduction
"Miss You" was created by m-flo, a Japanese hip-hop group and sung by melody. and Ryohei Yamamoto. The Japanese-American female singer "melody." was a recording artist from 2003 to 2008. "Miss You" was ranked as the eighth most popular single in the Oricon charts.

Track listing
 miss you / m-flo loves melody. & Ryohei
 Astrosexy / m-flo loves CHEMISTRY
 miss you  (Instrumental) / m-flo loves melody. & Ryohei
 Astrosexy  (Instrumental) / m-flo loves CHEMISTRY

References

2003 singles
M-Flo songs
Songs written by Verbal (rapper)
Songs written by Taku Takahashi
Japanese-language songs